Auguste Henri Ponsot (2 March 1877 – 5 October 1963) was a French politician and statesman.

Life
Auguste Henri was born in Bologna, Italy. After law studies at the University of Dijon, Ponsot entered the diplomatic career in 1903. After having stayed in Siam, Berlin and Canada, he was appointed as the Secretary General of the Tunisian Government in 1922. Appointed to the Sub-Directorate of African Affairs, he negotiated with the Spain an agreement for a joint action in Morocco and lead the talks of Oujda in May 1925.

Ponsot became the French High Commissioner in Syria and Lebanon in August 1926 until 23 July 1933. Afterwards, he served as the French resident-general in Morocco from August 1933 to March 1936. From 1936 to 1938, Ponsot was the French Ambassador to Turkey in Ankara.

Later on, Ponsot led the discussions with Amin al-Husseini in which the French authorities expected an improvement in France's status in the Arab world through his intermediaries. After the World War II, Ponsot worked in Geneva to participate in the creation of the Office of the United Nations High Commissioner for Refugees. He remained there for several years until his final retirement.

See also 
 High commissioner
 Mandate for Syria and the Lebanon

References 

French Ministers of Overseas France
1877 births
1963 deaths
High Commissioners of the Levant
Resident generals of Morocco
Ambassadors of France to Turkey
Italian emigrants to France
French expatriates in Thailand
French expatriates in Germany
French expatriates in Canada